Anaphe panda is a moth of the family Notodontidae. It was described by Jean Baptiste Boisduval in 1847. It is found in Cameroon, the Democratic Republic of the Congo, Equatorial Guinea, Kenya, Malawi, South Africa, Tanzania and the Gambia.

The larvae have been recorded feeding on Bridelia micrantha.

Larvae are eaten in Central Africa and are especially liked because of their high fat content.

References

 

Notodontidae
Moths described in 1847
Moths of Africa